Derrick Richardson (born April 3, 1986) is a former American football safety for the Florida Tuskers of the United Football League. He was signed by the Pittsburgh Steelers as an undrafted free agent in 2009. He played college football at New Mexico State.

Professional career

Pittsburgh Steelers
He was signed as a rookie free agent by the Pittsburgh Steelers on April 27, 2009. He was waived on August 31.

External links
Just Sports Stats
Pittsburgh Steelers bio
United Football League bio

Living people
1986 births
Players of American football from Denver
American football safeties
New Mexico State Aggies football players
Pittsburgh Steelers players
Florida Tuskers players